Emergency is an upcoming Indian Hindi-language biographical film directed and produced by Kangana Ranaut, from a screenplay by Ritesh Shah and story by Ranaut. Based on the 1977 Indian Emergency, it stars Ranaut as former Prime Minister of India Indira Gandhi. The film also features Anupam Kher, Shreyas Talpade, Mahima Chaudhry and Milind Soman in pivotal roles.

Principal photography commenced in July 2022 and ended in January 2023. It marks the posthumous film of Satish Kaushik following his death on 9 March 2023.

Cast
 Kangana Ranaut as Prime Minister Indira Gandhi
 Anupam Kher as Jayaprakash Narayan
 Shreyas Talpade as Atal Bihari Vajpayee
 Mahima Chaudhary as Pupul Jayakar, Indira Gandhi's close confidante
 Milind Soman as Field Marshal Sam Manekshaw
 Vishak Nair as Sanjay Gandhi
 Satish Kaushik as Jagjivan Ram

References 

2020s Hindi-language films
Upcoming Hindi-language films
Indian biographical films